The Great Seal of the State of Arizona. According to Article 22, Section 20 of the State of Arizona Constitution by the Arizona State Legislature:

Design
Section 20. "The seal of the State shall be of the following design: In the background shall be a range of mountains, with the sun rising behind the peaks thereof, and at the right side of the range of mountains there shall be a storage reservoir and a dam, below which in the middle distance are irrigated fields and orchards reaching into the foreground, at the right of which are cattle grazing. To the left in the middle distance on a mountainside is a quartz mill in front of which and in the foreground is a miner standing with pick and shovel. Above this device shall be the motto: "Ditat Deus." In a circular band surrounding the whole device shall be inscribed: "Great Seal of The State of Arizona", with the year of admission of the State into the Union."

The miner depicted on the state seal is George Warren, who had the original mining claim in Bisbee, Arizona in 1877, and who the town of Warren, Arizona is named after.

According to state statute (Arizona law) the State of Arizona, Secretary of State is the keeper of the seal, and may grant a certificate of approval for a state agency. The use of the seal cannot be used outside of state government. Any person who knowingly violates the law is guilty of a Class 3 misdemeanor. It cannot be used for commercial purposes under Arizona state law.

History
The "official" Arizona State Seal was designed by Phoenix newspaper artist, E.E. Motter. History and a downloadable brochure can be found on the Secretary's website.

See also

 List of Arizona state symbols
 Flag of Arizona

References

External links
 The Great Seal of the State of Arizona

Arizona
Symbols of Arizona
Arizona
Arizona
Arizona
Arizona
Arizona
Arizona
Arizona